A roundup is a police operation of interpellation and arrest of people taken at random from a public place, or targeting a particular population by ethnicity, appearance, or other perceived membership in a targeted group. To ensure operational success, organizers rely on the element of surprise in order to reduce the risk of evasion as much as possible. When the operation involves large numbers of individuals not targeted for any perceived group membership, it may be called a mass arrest.

Roma in Europe

Spanish Monarchy 

The Great Gypsy Round-up was a raid authorized and organized by the Spanish Monarchy that led to the arrest of all gypsies (Romani) in the region, and their imprisonment in labor camps. The raid was approved by  King Ferdinand VI of Spain, was organized by the Marquis of Ensenada, and was set in motion simultaneously across Spain on 30 July 1749.

World War II

Belgium 

The Jewish population of Belgium was rounded up four times during the Second World War. The first two roundups took place on 15 and 28 August 1942 in Antwerp under the command of SS NCO . They were conducted by feldgendarmes, German and Flemish SS officers, and Belgian police. A third roundup took place on 11 September 1942. In Brussels, the situation was different and the mayor, who had already opposed the Germans on the issue of the compulsory wearing of the Jewish yellow badge, an order that he refused to enforce, arguing that there was a lack of manpower so that his police would not be involved in the roundups. A single nighttime roundup took place in Brussels on 3 September  1942. Liège and Charleroi each also had a single roundup in August and September 1942.

Germany 

As part of the implementation of the Nazi Final Solution, the Gestapo rounded up Jews in Germany and forced them into confined ghettos, while seizing their homes and possessions.

France 

French police carried out numerous roundups (rafles) of Jews during World War II, including the Green ticket roundup in 1941, the massive Vélodrome d'Hiver round-up in 1942 in which over 13,000 Jews were arrested, the rafle of Clermont-Ferrand (25 November 1943), and the roundup in the Old Port of Marseille in 1943. Almost all of those arrested were deported to Auschwitz or other death camps.

Poland 

In Poland, German SS, Wehrmacht, and Gestapo teams rounded up civilians on the streets of Polish cities. Those arrested were in most cases chosen at random from among passers-by or inhabitants of city quarters surrounded by German forces prior to the action.

Known as a łapanka, the term usually refers to the action of rounding up and arresting a number of random people. Those caught in a łapanka were either taken hostage, arrested, sent to labor camps or concentration camps, or summarily executed.

Those caught in roundups were most often sent to slave labour in Nazi Germany, but some were also taken as hostages or executed in reprisal actions; imprisoned and sent to concentration camps or summarily executed in numerous ethnic-cleansing operations.

Bialystok 

In February 1943, 10,000 Jews from the Białystok Ghetto were rounded up and sent aboard Holocaust trains to their deaths at the Treblinka extermination camp.

Cambodia 

The state of Chinese Cambodians during the Khmer Rouge regime was alleged to be "the worst disaster ever to befall any ethnic Chinese community in Southeast Asia." Hundreds of Cham, Chinese and Khmer families were rounded up in 1978 and told that they were to be resettled, but were actually executed. At the beginning of the Khmer Rouge regime in 1975, there were 425,000 ethnic Chinese in Cambodia; by the end of 1979 there were just 200,000 stuck at Thai refugee camps or Cambodia. 170,000 Chinese fled Cambodia to Vietnam while others were repatriated.

Immigrants

Belgium 

As a result of the European migrant crisis, Maximilian Park in Brussels became a refugee camp, a meeting place for migrants, volunteers and associations since 2015.

In July 2017, the citizen platform of support for refugees denounced raids which had been organized in May and June. This was also the case of Le Ciré, a non-profit association created in 1954 whose goal is to allow refugees and foreigners to learn about the economic, social, and cultural life of the country in order to facilitate their integration in Belgium.

Numerous accounts report recurrent raids, during which numerous irregularities were noted, such as the unwarranted use of force on weak and/or elderly migrants as well as on volunteer citizens leading to several hundred complaints being filed with Committee P, the police oversight committee.

United States 

In 1997, local police and U.S. federal authorities patrolled the streets of Chandler, Arizona and stopped hundreds of suspected Hispanic people based on their physical appearance, demanded proof of citizenship, and arrested those who could not provide it. A total of 432 illegal immigrants were arrested in Chandler and later deported.

See also 

 Anti-gay purges in Chechnya
 Executions of Kokkinia
 The Holocaust in Italy
 Internment of Japanese Americans
 List of Jewish ghettos in German-occupied Poland
 Nazi ghettos
 Operation Wetback
 Pope Pius XII and the raid on the Roman ghetto
 Raid of the Ghetto of Rome
 Rue Sainte-Catherine Roundup

References

Works cited 

 

 

 

 

 

 

 

 

 

 

 

 

  
 

 

Criminal justice
Political repression
Genocide